Gisèle Ongollo (born 20 February 1966) is a Gabonese sprinter. She competed in the 100 metres at the 1984 Summer Olympics and the 1988 Summer Olympics.

References

External links
 

1966 births
Living people
Athletes (track and field) at the 1984 Summer Olympics
Athletes (track and field) at the 1988 Summer Olympics
Gabonese female sprinters
Olympic athletes of Gabon
Place of birth missing (living people)
Olympic female sprinters
21st-century Gabonese people